The Battle of Mainz (29 October 1795) saw a Habsburg army led by François Sebastien Charles Joseph de Croix, Count of Clerfayt launch a surprise assault against four divisions of the French Army of Rhin-et-Moselle directed by François Ignace Schaal. The right-hand French division fled the battlefield, compelling the other three divisions to retreat with the loss of their siege artillery and many casualties. The War of the First Coalition action was fought near the city of Mainz in the today state of Rhineland-Palatinate in Germany.

French troops had ineffectively besieged the western side of Mainz Fortress since December 1794. However, in early September 1795 the Army of Sambre-et-Meuse crossed the lower Rhine River and advanced south to the Main River. For the first time Mainz was besieged on the east side of the river, but this state of affairs did not last very long. In the Battle of Höchst, Clerfayt outmaneuvered Jourdan, forcing his army to retire to the west bank of the Rhine. With Jourdan temporarily out of the picture, Clerfayt fell on Schaal's somewhat isolated corps and drove it away to the south. During this time the commander of the Army of Rhin-et-Moselle, Jean-Charles Pichegru was in treasonous contact with France's enemies, perhaps accounting for Austria's success. The next clash was the Battle of Pfeddersheim on 10 November.

The siege was the second time balloon reconnaissance had been used, after the Battle of Fleurus (1794).

People involved
François Sebastien Charles Joseph de Croix, Count of Clerfayt
Jean Baptiste Kléber
Laurent de Gouvion-Saint-Cyr
Gabriel Jean Joseph Molitor
Adam Albert von Neipperg
Antoine Christophe Merlin
Auguste de Marmont
Jean Bernadotte
Franz von Weyrother
 Franz Joseph, Marquis de Lusignan
François, marquis de Chasseloup-Laubat
François Séverin Marceau-Desgraviers
Jean-Marie-Joseph Coutelle
Joseph Marie, Count Dessaix
Nicolas-Jacques Conté
Paul Louis Courier
Armée de Mayence
Serbian mercenaries (see: Kočina Krajina Serb rebellion in 1791) under General Major Stephan Bernhard Keglevich did not take part, but were involved as neutral observers (see map below).
Frédéric-César de La Harpe did not take part, but was involved, had a leading role in the creation of the Helvetic Republic.

Military units 

 54th Infantry Regiment (France) under Colonel Sauvat(?)
 Hessian (soldiers) under Colonel Johann Keglevich. He was awarded the Military Order of Maria Theresa in 1798 "for by his own initiative undertaken and successfully a campaign significantly affecting feats of arms, which an officer of honor would may have omitted without blame".

References 
 Smith, D. The Greenhill Napoleonic Wars Data Book. Greenhill Books, 1998.

Battles involving Austria
Battles involving Serbia
1795 in France
1795 in Austria
Battles of the War of the First Coalition
History of Mainz
Battles in Rhineland-Palatinate